Tagesschau (German for Review of the Day) is a German national and international television news service produced by the editorial staff of ARD-aktuell on behalf of the German public-service television network ARD.

The main edition of the programme is aired at 20:00 (08:00 pm) on Das Erste. It is also simulcast on several ARD-affiliated networks, including NDR Fernsehen, RBB Fernsehen, SWR Fernsehen, WDR Fernsehen, hr-fernsehen, 3sat, Phoenix, and ARD-alpha. It also broadcasts for most of the day on tagesschau24. In addition, recorded Tagesschau newscasts can also be seen via YouTube internationally.

History 

Tagesschau (literally "Day's Show", or loosely "(Re)view of the Day"; a play on the term Wochenschau, the weekly newsreel formerly shown in cinemas) is both the oldest and the most watched news program on German television. The first edition was transmitted on Nordwestdeutscher Rundfunk (North-Western German Broadcasting) on 26 December 1952. Initially broadcast three times a week, the programme expanded in 1956 to air Monday to Saturday, with Sunday editions beginning in 1961. The nightly 8-pm edition of Tagesschau is watched by up to 10 million viewers, equivalent to a 33% audience reach. Currently, the bulletin is produced by NDR (Northern German Broadcasting) through ARD-aktuell (the ARD's news department) from its studios in Hamburg.

The main 15-minute bulletin is broadcast at 20:00 CET or CEST (08:00 pm CET or CEST) each evening with shorter bulletins broadcast throughout the day. The end of the 20:00 bulletin, at 20:15, marks the beginning of prime time on German television, in which both ARD and ZDF end commercial advertising on Monday thru Saturday evenings (the clock with hours, minutes, and seconds is shown in the last ad break, a final in-clock ad is aired before the chime). An attempt by commercial station Sat.1 in the late 1990s to begin their prime time schedule at 20:00 was so unsuccessful that it was discontinued after only a few weeks.

In 1978, the late edition of Tagesschau was replaced by Tagesthemen (Subjects of the Day or "Themes of the Day"), a half-hour programme featuring more in-depth reports, analysis, and commentary. The programme continues to air at 22:15 each evening. A late-night, magazine-style programme, Nachtmagazin (Night Magazine), airs at around 00:30. A weekly review programme entitled Wochenspiegel (Mirror of the Week) was produced by the Tagesschau production team and aired on Sundays around lunch time. The program aired its last episode on 24 August 2014 in a major reshuffle.

The program's trademark continues to be the eight o'clock chime followed by a recorded announcement, spoken by Claudia Urbschat-Mingues, "Hier ist das Erste Deutsche Fernsehen mit der Tagesschau" ("This is First German Television with the Tagesschau").  The Tagesschau theme music has remained the same since 1956, although the arrangement has been modernized several times, most recently in 2014 by Henning Lohner.

On 25 July 1988 the Tagesschau was on the brink of being cancelled due to a warning strike organized by the broadcasting union RFFU. This blackout would have been for the first (and only) time in its history, but the Rundschau from Bavaria, produced by Bayerisches Fernsehen (Bavarian Television) in Munich, helped out as a substitute program.

Tagesschau aired its 20,000th broadcast on 31 December 2010.

Presenters

Chief anchors
 Karl-Heinz Köpcke (1964–1987; newsreader from 1959)
 Werner Veigel (1987–1995; newsreader from 1966)
 Dagmar Berghoff (1995–1999; newsreader from 1976)
 Jo Brauner (2000–2004; newsreader from 1974)
 Jan Hofer (2004–2020; newsreader from 1985)
 Jens Riewa (2020–present; newsreader from 1994)

Current presenters

 Jens Riewa, since 1994†
 Susanne Daubner, since 1999†
 Thorsten Schröder, since 2000†
 Susanne Holst, since 2001
 Michail Paweletz, since 2004
 Judith Rakers, since 2005†
 Jan Malte Andresen, since 2014
 Constantin Schreiber, since 2017†
 Julia-Niharika Sen, since 2018†

Former presenters 
in alphabetical order
 Ellen Arnhold, 1987–2015†
 Marc Bator, 2001–2013†
 Ina Bergmann, 1997–2001
 Dagmar Berghoff, 1976–1999†
 Claus-Erich Boetzkes, 1995-2021†
 Jo Brauner, 1974–2004†
 Elfi Marten-Brockmann, 1981–1984
 Lothar Dombrowski, 1967–1974†
 Laura Dünnwald, 2001–2010†
 Klaus Eckert, 1978–1983†
 Karl Fleischer, 1960–1994†
 Caroline Hamann, 2007–2009†
 Jan Thilo Haux
 Eva Herman, 1989–2007†
 Jan Hofer, 1985–2020†
 Georg Hopf, 1975–1985
 Horst Jaedicke
 Silke Jürgensen, 2002–2005
 Karolin Kandler, 2018-2022
 Karl-Heinz Köpcke 1959–1987†
 Franz Laake, 1988–1993
 Siegmar Ruhmland, 1960–1963
 Diether von Sallwitz, 1959–1963
 Manfred Schmidt, 1962–1964
 Robert Schröder, 1988
 Susan Stahnke, 1992–1999†
 Wilhelm Stöck, 1965–1984†
 Martin Svoboda
 Harry Teubner, 1978–1980
 Martin Thon
 Werner Veigel, 1966–1995†
 Astrid Vits, 2004-2018
 Cay Dietrich Voss, 1952–1962
 Wilhelm Wieben, 1972–1998†
 Daniela Witte, 1985–1988†
 Günter Wiatrek, 1974–1975
 Claus Wunderlich, 1959–1962
 Tarek Youzbachi, 2004-2021
 Linda Zervakis, 2010-2021†

† The person who is/was currently or previously anchoring in the main 15-minute newscast of Tagesschau.

Awards 
 1987: Goldene Kamera best TV anchorwoman for Dagmar Berghoff
 1997: Goldenes Kabel Publikumspreis in Silber for the best news broadcast
 2000: Deutscher Comedypreis special award for unvoluntary comedy
 2003: Bayerischer Filmpreis special award for the best editorial teams during 50 years
 2012: Grimme Online Award for the "Tagesschau" app
 2014: Eyes and Ears Award for the new studio design, animations and graphic techniques.

Media studies and criticism

Plurality of perspectives lacking
The long-term study of the Otto Brenner Stiftung by Hans-Jürgen Arlt and Wolfgang Storz from March 2010 on "Business Journalism during the crisis - The mass media handling of the financial market policy" analyzed working methods of the news broadcasts from 1999 to fall 2009, especially in news formats like Tagesschau and Tagesthemen. The study arrives at the conclusion that these formats failed during the crisis, due to the editorial team's lack of different perspectives, focusing solely on representatives of the German government, banks, some scientists and their points of view. "This narrowing of perspective leads to severe losses of reality which is to be considered as serious journalistic misconduct".

Bias in covering the Ukraine Crisis 2013/2014 
In September 2014, following a critical review from the editorial council (Programmbeirat), ARD-aktuell stated: "Criticism of our news-coverage respecting Ukraine has caused an echo on a hitherto unprecedented scale".

Bias in not covering criminal incidents involving refugees 
In the case of the 2016 murder of the 19-year-old daughter of a high-ranking EU official by an Afghan refugee, Tagesschau did not report the case in its main edition on 3 December, claiming it was of only "regional significance" and that "the special protection for juveniles" would apply in this case. Public broadcaster ZDF had carried the story. Tagesschaus reasons for not reporting it were subjected to criticism, Stern magazine wrote that they had given an "absurd" explanation for their "ignorance". Two days later, ARD magazine Tagesthemen started to report about the case after public pressure. When chancellor Angela Merkel was questioned about the case during the programme, she stated: "If the fact should prove true that an Afghan refugee is responsible, then we should absolutely condemn this, exactly as in the case of any other murderer, and we should clearly name this." ARD announced their intent to engage a "quality manager" henceforth to deal with the growing public criticism of their decisions.

In the case of the 2017 murder of 15-year-old Mia V. by an Afghan refugee, unlike other German TV news broadcasters, ARD Tagesschau did not report the case at first. Only after public pressure Tagesschau featured the incident in its main edition.

References

External links

 

ARD (broadcaster)
German television news shows
Television shows set in Hamburg
1952 German television series debuts
1950s German television series
1960s German television series
1970s German television series
1980s German television series
1990s German television series
2000s German television series
2010s German television series
2020s German television series
Das Erste original programming
German-language television shows
German news websites